Kim Doochul is a South Korean theoretical physicist. He was head of the Department of Physics, director of the BK21 Physics Research Division, and professor emeritus at Seoul National University. He was also a fellow and chairperson in the Korean Academy of Science and Technology before becoming the fifth president of Korea Institute for Advanced Study and the second president of Institute for Basic Science. He was a standing trustee with the Asia Pacific Center for Theoretical Physics and a board of Trustee member of the Korean Physical Society.

Education
Kim received his bachelor of science in electronic engineering from Seoul National University in 1970 and a Ph.D. in electrical engineering from Johns Hopkins University in 1974 with a focus in statistical physics.

Career
From 1974 to 1977, he was a postdoctoral research fellow at New York University and the University of Melbourne. Next he became a professor in the Department of Physics and Astronomy of Seoul National University (SNU), a position he held through August 2010. While at SNU, he was also chairperson in the Department of Physics, director of the BK21 Physics Research Division, head of the Department of Physics, and professor emeritus. Within the Korean Academy of Science and Technology, he was a fellow and later chairperson of the Division of Natural Sciences.

From July 2010 to June 2013, he was the 5th president of the Korea Institute for Advanced Study. After winning the 20th Sudang Prize in Basic Science in 2011, he became the Basic Science Committee Member for the Sudang Award from the 21st presentation to the 29th (2012-2019). His final position was as the second president of the Institute for Basic Science from September 2014 until September 2019. His November farewell ceremony was also the inauguration ceremony for incoming president Noh Do Young.

Awards and honors
2011: 20th Sudang Prize in Basic Science
2011: 52nd Samil Cultural Award in Natural Sciences, Samil Foundation
2009: 58th Seoul City Cultural Award in Natural Sciences
2008: Education Award, Seoul National University 
1998: Academic Award for Outstanding Research, Korean Physical Society
1987: Best Paper Award, Korean Physical Society

References

External links
Kim Doochul - Google Scholar

Seoul National University alumni
Academic staff of KAIST
1948 births
Living people
Theoretical physicists
South Korean physicists
Johns Hopkins University alumni
Presidents of the Institute for Basic Science
South Korean scientists